Clayton Geathers (born June 1, 1992) is an American football strong safety who is a free agent. He played college football at UCF, and was drafted by the Indianapolis Colts in the fourth round of the 2015 NFL Draft.

High school career
Geathers attended and played at Carvers Bay High School and help them advance to the Lower State Championship two consecutive years (2007-2008). Geathers was selected to the all-state team twice as a defensive back in 2009 and as a running back in 2008.

College career
Geathers was selected to the All-American Athletic Conference Second-team, Sporting News All-American Athletic Conference Team and Phil Steele's Postseason All-American Athletic Conference Second-team in his junior season.

Geathers finished third in tackles in University of Central Florida football history with 383 tackles.  As a redshirt freshman in 2011, Geather had 67 tackles, the following year as a sophomore had 117 tackles, then as a redshirt junior 100 tackles, and then in his last season Geathers tallied 97 tackles.  Geathers also started in 52 games out of a total of 53 games he played in college.

Professional career

Indianapolis Colts
On December 15, 2014, it was announced that Geathers had accepted his invitation to play in the 2015 Senior Bowl. On January 24, 2015, Geathers attended the Senior Bowl and played for Jacksonville Jaguars' head coach Gus Bradley's South team. He recorded four solo tackles as the South lost 34–13 to the North.
Geathers attended the NFL Scouting Combine in Indianapolis, Indiana and performed all of the combine drills. He finished second among his position group in the bench press, eighth in the broad jump, and 12th in the short and long shuttle.

On March 25, 2015, Geathers attended UCF's pro day, but opted to stand on his combine numbers and only run positional drills. Team representatives and scouts from all 32 NFL teams attended his pro day, including New England Patriots' head coach Bill Belichick. At the conclusion of the pre-draft process, Geathers was projected to be a fourth to seventh round pick or a priority undrafted free agent. He was ranked as the fifth best strong safety prospect in the draft by DraftScout.com and was ranked the 11th best safety by Scouts Inc.

2015

The Indianapolis Colts selected Geathers in the fourth round (109th overall) of the 2015 NFL Draft. Geathers was the sixth safety drafted in 2015. 

On May 6, 2015, the Indianapolis Colts signed Geathers to a four-year, $2.81 million contract that includes a signing bonus of $533,930.

Throughout training camp, he competed to be the starting free safety against Dwight Lowery after it was vacant due to the release of Sergio Brown. Head coach Chuck Pagano named Geathers the backup free safety, behind Dwight Lowery, to begin the regular season.

He made his professional regular season debut in the Indianapolis Colts' season-opener at the Buffalo Bills and recorded two solo tackles and deflected a pass in their 27–14 loss. Geathers was inactive for the Colts' Week 7 loss to the New Orleans Saints due to a knee injury. On November 22, 2015, Geathers earned his first career start after Mike Adams was unable to play due to a hamstring injury. Geathers finished the Colts' 24–21 win at the Atlanta Falcons with a season-high nine combined tackles in Week 11. He finished his rookie season in 2015 with 34 combined tackles (27 solo) and a pass deflection in 15 games and two starts.

2016
On January 5, 2016, the Indianapolis Colts announced their decision to fire defensive coordinator Greg Manusky. On January 7, 2016, the Indianapolis Colts hired former Baltimore Ravens' linebackers coach Ted Monachino as their new defensive coordinator. Geathers entered training camp slated as the starting free safety. On July 26, 2016, it was reported that Geathers fractured a bone in his foot during training camp. Head coach Chuck Pagano named Geathers the starting free safety to start the regular season, alongside strong safety Mike Adams.

Geathers remained inactive for the Colts' season-opening 39–35 loss to the Detroit Lions due to his foot injury. On September 25, 2016, Geathers recorded six combined tackles and forced a fumble in a 26–22 win against the San Diego Chargers in Week 3. Geathers forced a key fumble by Chargers' tight end Hunter Henry, which was recovered by Colts' teammate Mike Adams, in the fourth quarter. In Week 5, he collected a season-high nine combined tackles during a 29-23 win against the Chicago Bears. On November 20, 2016, Geathers tied his season-high of nine combined tackles and deflected a pass in the Colts' 24–17 victory against the Tennessee Titans in Week 11. He exited in the fourth quarter of the game after sustaining a concussion and neck injury while tackling Titans' running back Demarco Murray during a crucial fourth and one-yard attempt with less than three minutes remaining.
On December 12, 2016, the Indianapolis Colts officially placed Geathers on injured reserve due to his neck injury. He finished the season with 59 combined tackles (50 solo) and five pass deflections in nine games and nine starts.

2017
During the offseason, Geathers underwent surgery to repair a bulging herniated disc in his neck in March 2017. On September 2, 2017, the Indianapolis Colts placed Geathers on their physically unable to perform list to start the season as he recovered from neck surgery. On November 14, 2017, the Indianapolis Colts activated Geathers off of their PUP list. Upon returning from injury, Geathers was named the backup free safety behind Darius Butler. Geathers was inactive for the Colts' Week 16 loss at the Baltimore Ravens due to personal reasons. In Week 17, he collected a season-high three combined tackles during a 22–13 victory against the Houston Texans. Geathers was limited to five games and one start in 2017 and finished the season with eight combined tackles (five solo).

2018

On January 1, 2018, the Indianapolis Colts fired head coach Chuck Pagano after they finished with a 4–12 record in 2017. On February 11, 2018, the Indianapolis Colts announced their decision to hire former Philadelphia Eagles' offensive coordinator Frank Reich to be their next head coach. Reich and defensive coordinator Matt Eberflus switched the defense from a base 3-4 defense to a base 4-3 defense. Throughout training camp, Geathers competed against Matthias Farley to be the starting strong safety. He was named the Colts starting strong safety to begin the season.

He started in the Indianapolis Colts' season-opener against the Cincinnati Bengals and recorded seven solo tackles and forced a fumble in their 34–23 loss. On September 23, 2018, Geathers collected 13 combined tackles (11 solo) and deflected a pass during a 20–16 loss at the Philadelphia Eagles in Week 3.

2019
On March 20, 2019, Geathers re-signed with the Colts.
In week 3 against the Atlanta Falcons, Geathers intercepted Matt Ryan in the 27-24 win.

Tennessee Titans
On August 16, 2021, Geathers signed with the Tennessee Titans. He was released on August 29, 2021.

Coaching career
In April 2022, Geathers returned home to UCF to join Gus Malzahn's coaching staff as assistant director of personnel and defensive backs assistant.

Personal life
Geathers is the nephew of retired NFL defensive end Jumpy Geathers, cousin of Orlando Predators defensive end Jeremy Geathers, free agent defensive end Clifton Geathers, free agent nose tackle Kwame Geathers, former Cincinnati Bengals defensive end Robert Geathers, and former UCF defensive end Jarvis Geathers.

References

External links
 UCF bio

1992 births
Living people
People from Georgetown, South Carolina
Players of American football from South Carolina
American football safeties
UCF Knights football players
Indianapolis Colts players
Tennessee Titans players
Ed Block Courage Award recipients
Geathers family